Welford is a rural village and civil parish in West Berkshire, England occupying both sides of the valley of the River Lambourn north-west of Newbury and south of Wantage.  It forms a strip parish which tapers in the south where it contains the hamlet of Halfway.  It incorporates Welford Park with its annual snowdrop displays. The M4 motorway passes through the parish, but has no junctions within it. RAF Welford, a munitions depot used by the United States Air Force, is to the north of the village.

Notable buildings

Welford Park house
The history of the manor is long. It was held by Abingdon Abbey for centuries until the Dissolution of the Monasteries. Overlordship was for some decades after in the hands of the Crown, and was attached to the manor of Benham Lovell, while the overlordship of the vill of Easton Welford was attached to the manor of East Greenwich. Its history included a share held by Thomas Knyvet and within 20 years was sold to Francis Jones in the 1600s. It descended in the same family to the Mason, Archer and Houblon branches. The main vestige is the rebuilt manor house at Welford Park, which can be visited for its woodlands and early spring displays of snowdrops. It is the property of the lord of the manor, Col. G. B. Archer-Houblon, but...the residence of Major R. P. Cobbold."

Saint Gregory's church
The Church of England parish church of St Gregory is one of only two existing round-tower churches in Berkshire, the other being St Mary's at Great Shefford which adjoins the parish to the north-west. The church is a Grade II* listed building.

Transport
The village was formerly served by Welford Park railway station on the Lambourn Valley Railway, but the line closed to passenger traffic in 1960 and to freight traffic, to and from RAF Welford, in the 1970s. The station site is now a car park for visitors to Welford Park. The village is situated midway between junctions 13 and 14 of the M4.

Demography

References

External links

Website with photos of Welford St. Gregory, a round-tower church
 A History of RAF Welford and Greenham Common

 
Villages in Berkshire
Civil parishes in Berkshire
West Berkshire District